is the first major label album release of the Japanese rock band, The Back Horn.  The album was released on October 17, 2001.

Track listing

Ikusen Kounen no Kodoku (幾千光年の孤独) – 4:19
Serenade (セレナーデ) – 4:33
Sunny (サニー) – 3:54
First major single.
Hachigatsu no Himitsu (８月の秘密) – 3:23
Suisou (水槽) – 4:40
Mr. World (ミスターワールド) – 3:45
Hyou Hyou to (ひょうひょうと) – 3:55
AKAI YAMI (アカイヤミ) – 3:49
Ame (雨) – 5:43
Sora, Hoshi, Umi no Yoru (空、星、海の夜) – 5:36
Second major single.
Yuuyake March (夕焼けマーチ) – 3:45

The Back Horn albums
2001 albums
Victor Entertainment albums